Tim Sheens (born 30 October 1950) is an Australian professional rugby league football coach and former player. Head Coach of the Australia national team between 2009 and 2015, he has also been the head coach of National Rugby League (NRL) clubs, the Penrith Panthers, the Canberra Raiders, the North Queensland Cowboys and the Wests Tigers. As a player, Sheens was a prop forward with Sydney's Penrith club in the 1970s and 1980s before he retired and became their coach.
Sheens returned to the Wests Tigers in 2021 as the Head of Football Operations.

He then coached the Raiders, taking them to victory in the 1989, 1990 and 1994 premierships. With the Tigers he won the 2005 premiership. Sheens also set a new record for most games in Australian rugby league premiership history and also coached the New South Wales Blues for the 1991 State of Origin series. In June 2015 he accepted a role with Super League club the Salford Red Devils to become Director of Rugby leading to his eventual resignation as the coach of the Australian National Team in October later that year. In September 2016 it was announced that he would join then Super League club the Hull Kingston Rovers and he formally stepped down from his role at Salford Red Devils as they confronted Hull Kingston Rovers in the £1M Game relegation decider. Salford Red Devils won the game but Sheens confirmed his decision to coach Hull Kingston Rovers in 2017, in the Championship.

It was announced that Sheens would return to the Wests Tigers in 2021 working in pathways, development, and talent identification. Sheens was later announced as the club's coach for the 2023 and 2024 seasons.

Playing career 
Born to a well known rugby league family of the Penrith area, Tim Sheens was educated at St Dominic's College in Penrith but spent his last two years of school at St Gregory's College, Campbelltown, where he was the school captain and First XIII captain in 1968.

Sheens had a lengthy playing stint with Penrith Panthers, playing 166 first grade games from 1970 to 1982 and scoring 11 tries. Starting his career as a backrower, he finished as a ball-playing prop. In 1974 he was named as the Penrith Panthers' Player of the Year, but had his jaw broken in the inaugural Amco Cup final against Western Division.

By 1982, Sheens had played a club record 258 games in all grades, but was unable to come to terms with the club for another season. With 166 first grade appearances, Sheens was the most capped Penrith Panthers player until Royce Simmons surpassed him in the 1989 season. Sheens was soon coaxed out of retirement though, playing one season with the Campbelltown City Kangaroos in 1983, captaining that club to the Group 6 Rugby League premiership that season.

In October 2006, in recognition of his contribution as a player, Sheens was named as one of the Penrith Panthers "Team of Legends".

Tim Sheens' brother, Bob, was also a first grade NSWRFL player for Eastern Suburbs.

Coaching career

Penrith Panthers
Although his first ever game as first-grade coach was a 24–12 loss to St George, Tim Sheens has a track-record of reforming under-performing teams to premiership victory.  He brought Penrith to their first finals series ever in 1985, before departing the club at the end of the 1987 season.

Canberra Raiders
Sheens coached the Canberra Raiders to their first premiership in 1989. In the post season he travelled with the Raiders to England for the 1989 World Club Challenge which was lost to Widnes. He won further premierships with Canberra in 1990 and 1994.

North Queensland Cowboys 
However, his time with the North Queensland Cowboys (1997–2001) was less successful and, after board discussions, a period of stress-leave and while News Limited launched a take-over of the club, he resigned from North Queensland on 25 May 2001.

Wests Tigers
In 2002, Sheens accepted the coaching position with the Wests Tigers for the 2003 season, replacing Terry Lamb. The feat of the Wests Tigers winning the 2005 Grand Final against the Cowboys has been largely attributed to Sheens.

Sheens has coached four premiership winning teams, making him second only to Wayne Bennett among current coaches. Sheens was awarded the Dally M Coach of the Year in 1984, 1990 and 2005.

As NRL Premiers Wests travelled to England to play against Super League champions Bradford Bulls in the 2006 World Club Challenge. Sheens oversaw the Tigers' 30–10 loss.

In December 2007, Sheens' contract with the Tigers – due to expire at the end of the 2008 season – was extended to 2010.

On 3 May 2010, Sheens became the first coach in Australian rugby league history to reach 600 games. In 2011, Penrith Panthers offered Tim the job as head coach for the club. However, on 29 April 2011, Tim decided to stay coach for the Tigers and extended his coaching contract for until 2014. On 25 September 2012, after days of speculation about Sheen's future due to a poor recent season, the Tigers announced Sheens would not coach the team in the 2013 season, but offered him other roles at the club.

Salford Red Devils
On 23 June 2015, Sheens become director of rugby league at the English rugby league club Salford Red Devils.

Hull Kingston Rovers 
In September 2016  it was announced that he would join Hull Kingston Rovers for season 2017 and beyond. In Sheens first year at the club, he coached the Hull Kingston Rovers in their promotion back to Super League campaign of 2017. After 2 years at Hull KR, Sheens was sacked due to poor league position, form and loss of 'the dressing room' (implying player support) on 5 June 2019.

Widnes Vikings
On 13 Oct 2020 it was announced that Sheens had resigned as club head coach due to a falling out with management over staffing

Return to Wests Tigers 
It was announced that Sheens would return to the Wests Tigers in 2021 working in pathways, development, and talent identification. Sheens was later announced as the club's coach for the 2022 and 2023 seasons, with a succession plan in place colloquially known as the "Marshall Plan" (after the US foreign aid program of the 1940s) to allow 2005 premiership hero Benji Marshall to take over as head coach in 2025.

Representative coaching 
At the representative level, Sheens coached the 1991 ARL City Origin team to a 22–12 win over Country. In the same year, as coach of the NSW State of Origin team, he led the side to a 2–1 series loss to Queensland. In 1997 Sheens coached the NSW super league side to a 23 to 22 win over Queensland in a Tri series competition involving NSW Queensland and New Zealand.

Sheens returned to the NRL representative arena in 2006 when he succeeded Graham Murray as coach for City Origin, a post he retained in 2007 and 2008. In 2006, City lost to Country, 12 points to 10 but won in 2007, 12 points to 6. The 2008 match was a 22–22 draw, with City retaining the trophy.

In February 2009, Sheens was appointed coach of the Australian national rugby league team following the resignation of Ricky Stuart. Sheens coached the Kangaroos to their first win in his charge, defeating the Kiwis on 8 May 2009.

He coached the Kangaroos in their successful 2013 Rugby League World Cup campaign. The Aussies conceded just four tries in the entire tournament (all to England in their opening match). He gave Australia revenge against New Zealand in the final after losing to them in the 2008 Final.

Sheens resigned as the Kangaroos head coach on 3 October 2015, to take up a full-time position as director of Super League club Salford Red Devils.

Combined Nations
On 25 June 2021 he coached the Combined Nations All Stars in their 26-24 victory over England, staged at the Halliwell Jones Stadium, Warrington, as part of England’s 2021 Rugby League World Cup preparation.

Coaching record

Representative record

Overall (Representative) Record

As of 4 May 2015

Footnotes

External links 
Hull KR profile
 Profile at NRL.com
 Wests Tigers Official Site – current team

1950 births
Living people
Australian rugby league coaches
Australia national rugby league team coaches
Canberra Raiders coaches
Combined Nationalities rugby league team coaches
Hull Kingston Rovers coaches
New South Wales City Origin rugby league team coaches
New South Wales Rugby League State of Origin coaches
North Queensland Cowboys coaches
Penrith Panthers players
Penrith Panthers captains
Penrith Panthers coaches
Rugby league players from Sydney
Rugby league props
Widnes Vikings coaches
Wests Tigers coaches